Karnauti Halt railway station is a halt railway station on the Bakhtiyarpur–Tilaiya line under the Danapur railway division of East Central Railway zone. It is situated at Karnauti in Patna district in the Indian state of Bihar.

References 

Railway stations in Patna district
Danapur railway division